Pongpipat Kamnuan (born March 19, 1983) is a former professional footballer from Thailand.

Honours

Club
Thai Port F.C.
 Thai FA Cup winner (1) : 2009
 Thai League Cup winner (1) : 2010

References

External links
 Official Website
 

1983 births
Living people
Pongpipat Kamnuan
Pongpipat Kamnuan
Association football fullbacks
Pongpipat Kamnuan
Pongpipat Kamnuan
Pongpipat Kamnuan
Pongpipat Kamnuan